Olds is a town in central Alberta, Canada within Mountain View County and the Calgary–Edmonton Corridor. The nearest towns are Didsbury to the south, Bowden to the north, Sundre to the west and Three Hills to the east. The Canadian Pacific Railway's main Edmonton-Calgary line runs through the town.

Geography 
Olds lies within the Grasslands Natural Region of Alberta.

Climate
Olds has a humid continental climate (Köppen climate classification Dfb) and falls into the Natural Resources Canada (NRC) Plant Hardiness Zone 3b.

Winters are cold with temperatures often dropping to or below . These are broken up from the dry Chinook winds from the mountains.

Flora and fauna 
Olds has various species living in and around it including poplar trees and various wild grasses. Olds is an agriculture based town, so a large portion of the flora grown are crops of canola (Brassica juncea subsp. juncea) and barley (Hordeum vulgare).

The majority of fauna consists of livestock like cattle, and poultry. Many surrounding farms keep horses and/or donkeys.

Residential areas and neighbourhoods 
The town of Olds is surrounded by residential neighbourhoods with various styles of housing. There are several mobile home parks throughout the town.

Economy 
Olds Alberta has its own fiber optic Internet Service Provider called O-Net that provides gigabit speeds to its residents and businesses. The service cost the town about $21,000,000 to install. Olds has a big-box retail centre which opened in 2008. It features a Walmart, Canadian Tire, Home Hardware and other major retailers.

Demographics 

Education 
Olds has four schools; École Olds Elementary School, École Deer Meadow School, Olds High School and Holy Trinity Catholic School, as well as Olds College. Three schools in this area are part of the Chinook's Edge School Division No. 73

ÉOES is an elementary school containing grades k (kindergarten) - 4. The school contains a small gymnasium with a rock climbing wall. The gym previously doubled as the gymnastics centre for the gymnastics club, now located along 25th Ave.

ÉDMS is a junior high school containing grades 5–8. There is a slightly larger gym as well as a music room for the students beginning in the band programs.

OHS is a junior/senior high school containing grades 9–12. The school has a gymnasium and fitness centre, fine arts theatre and is part of the Olds College Campus. The school has a variety of educational programs such as sports, band, shop, drama and stained glass program.

Olds is home to Olds College, noted for its agricultural and fashion retail programs. As of 2012, Olds College also boast a significant Land Use Planning and Land Agent Program through their School of Environment and has gained accreditation from the Canadian Association of Certified Planning Technicians.

Sport and recreation
Olds is home to many sports team such as the Olds Grizzlys Alberta Junior Hockey League (AJHL), located at the Olds Sports Complex. Olds College Broncos part of the Alberta Colleges Athletics Conference, Olds Rapids Swim Club Located at the Olds Aquatic Centre. And many sporting events such as the Hay City Slam Skate Comp held every summer at the Olds Skate Park.

The Olds Gymnastics Club has recently migrated from their previous home in the Elementary School to a new building located along 25th Avenue. The building was formerly a Sears Canada building, and now is home to a gymnastics centre.

Olds houses the 185 Olds Royal Canadian Air Cadets Squadron. The building was formerly the Olds recreation centre and is now rendered to the squadron. The building is also rented out by many local dance and church programs.

Notable people 
Danielle Lappage, Olympic wrestler, competed in Rio 2016
Blake Richards, Canadian politician  Member of Parliament for  Banff-Airdrie (2008- current)
Jay Rosehill, professional ice hockey player

See also 
List of communities in Alberta
List of towns in Alberta

References

External links 

1896 establishments in Alberta
Mountain View County
Towns in Alberta